Kyls Burtland is a Canadian-born Australian composer working in film, television, advertising, sound installation and VR. Her TV credits include Bad Mothers (2019), Here Come the Habibs (2016), Whitlam: The Power and the Passion (2015), music for the Shanghai Pavilion interactive experience at World Expo 2010, music for the projections on the Sydney Opera House for Vivid Sydney (2013), and the song "Triumph of the One" for the 2006 Asian Games closing ceremony in Doha, sung by Aladdin (2007) star, Lea Salonga. In November 2019, she was awarded a full scholarship by composer and Song Hubs curator Ashley Irwin to attend APRA's Screen Song Hubs in LA and co-write songs for screen with artists including Megan Washington, John Dafario, Shelley Peikin and Daniel Denholm.

Biography 

Kyls is a graduate of the Australian Film, Television and Radio School where she studied screen composition under Nigel Westlake, and holds a Bmus (Hons) from the University of Sydney where she studied orchestral composition under Peter Sculthorpe. Her work has garnered a number of awards and nominations including Best Score upon graduation from AFTRS and a nomination for Emerging Talent of the Year by the Film Critics Circle of Australia (2002), and a New York Gold Promax for her rebrand of the ABC TV Theme (2007). Kyls has twice-won Songwriter of the Year through the Australian Songwriters Association (A.S.A) Awards. At the APRA Music Awards of 2010 she was nominated in the category, Best Music for a Short Film, for her work on Zero. In 2016, Kyls was nominated both for Best Television Theme at the APRA Music Awards of 2016 for Here Come the Habibs, and Best Theme at the Asian Television Awards for Destination Flavor Scandinavia.

Burtland formed a production duo, Heavenly Antennas, with Josh Wermut. During May–June 2013 they provided the score for Lighting of the Sails as part of the Vivid Sydney Festival. Burtland co-wrote "Misery" with Larissa Rate, who provided vocals for the electro-pop track, which was issued to promote the festival.

Kyls is also a content creator and early career TV producer, and was one of Screen Producers Australia (SPA's) Ones to Watch  in 2014.

Select credits 

 Zero  (2010)
 The Jesters (2009) 
 Whitlam: Power and the Passion  (2013)
 Rebels of Oz: Germaine, Clive, Barry and Bob  (2014) 
 Dawn (also known as 'Touch'), (2015)
 Destination Flavor Scandinavia  (2017)
 Here Come the Habibs (2017)
 Sando
 Bad Mothers

References

External links
 https://www.music-asia.com/2016/11/kyls-burtland-nominated-best-theme-song-ata2016/
 screenforever.org.au
 Kyls Burtland
 Shanghai Corporate Pavilion at the 2010 Shanghai World Expo

Australian film score composers
University of Sydney alumni
Women film score composers
Living people
Year of birth missing (living people)